The Château de Saint-Crépin  is a château in Saint-Crépin-de-Richemont, Dordogne, Nouvelle-Aquitaine, France. It was built in 1891.

References 

Châteaux in Dordogne
Houses completed in 1891